
Gmina Grodzisk Wielkopolski is an urban-rural gmina (administrative district) in Grodzisk Wielkopolski County, Greater Poland Voivodeship, in west-central Poland.

Villages
Apart from the town of Grodzisk Wielkopolski, Gmina Grodzisk Wielkopolski contains the villages and settlements of Albertowsko, Biała Wieś, Borzysław, Chrustowo, Czarna Wieś, Grąblewo, Kąkolewo, Kobylniki, Kurowo, Lasówki, Lulin, Ptaszkowo, Rojewo, Słocin, Snowidowo, Sworzyce, Woźniki and Zdrój.

Neighbouring gminas
Gmina Grodzisk Wielkopolski is bordered by the gminas of Granowo, Kamieniec, Nowy Tomyśl, Opalenica and Rakoniewice.

References

Polish official population figures 2006

Grodzisk Wielkopolski
Grodzisk Wielkopolski County